Oyarifa is a town in La Nkwantanang, a district in the Greater Accra Region of Ghana.

Town structure
The town is under the jurisdiction of the Ga East Municipal District and is in the Abokobi-Madina constituency of the Ghana parliament.

References

Accra
Populated places in the Greater Accra Region